Lorraine Ming Fair (born August 5, 1978) is a retired American professional soccer midfielder who was a member of the World Cup Champion United States national soccer team. Over the span of ten years, she was a part of one World Cup Team and three Olympic teams, and retired from international play in 2005.

Her twin sister, Ronnie Fair, (now Veronica Fair Sullins) was also a member of the national team, and when Ronnie was called in to participate in a game against England on May 9, 1997 at San Jose, California, it became the first time a pair of sisters played together in the Women's National Team.

Early career 
Lorrie and Ronnie both participated on Los Altos High School's female soccer team in Los Altos, California, where they grew up. They were born at Stanford Hospital, but moved to New York for three years before returning to the Bay Area in 1982. While Ronnie chose Stanford to go to college, Lorrie decided on the University of North Carolina at Chapel Hill instead, but not before being a two time NSCAA all-American and Parade magazine all-American. At UNC, she was picked as one of Soccer America's freshmen of the year, and she helped lead UNC to the NCAA championship in 1996, 1997, and 1999. She also won the Honda Sports Award as the nation's top soccer player.

National team career 

She joined the Under 20 national team in 1994, playing, among other events, in the Nordic Cup. In 1995, she was a member of the West Team at the US Olympic Festival, and she was invited to train with the National team. At 17 and a senior in high school, she was named an alternate for the 1996 Atlanta Olympic Games team that won the Gold. Fair rejected the chance to travel as an alternate because she was upset at being cut from national coach Tony DiCicco's main 16 player squad.

Fair had made her senior international debut against Norway in February 1996. In March 1998 she scored her first international goal against New Zealand at RFK Stadium.

After sitting out the 1996 Olympic games, she earned a more permanent spot on the team and in 1999, she was the youngest member of the team that won that year's FIFA Women's World Cup. She played every minute of the 2000 Olympics in Sydney, taking home a silver medal after an overtime loss to Norway in the championship game. In her last world event, she was an alternate on the Gold Medal-winning Olympic team in 2004 and then retired in 2005 with 120 international appearances.

International goals

Club career 

Fair played for the Philadelphia Charge in the WUSA (2001–2003), Olympique Lyonnais in Lyon, France (2005), and Chelsea FC in the UK (2008–2009).

Lorrie, Ronnie and their older brother, Greg all got their start and played for many years in AYSO Region 43.

She most recently played for Chelsea in the FA Women's Premier League. On February 1, 2008, it was announced that Fair had signed for Chelsea Ladies as a player, for whom she had been working solely as an ambassador up to that point. Fair vowed to continue her work with the club at grass roots level. The move was significant as she became the first American international to sign for a club in the Women's Premier League. Fair suffered a serious cruciate ligament injury in May 2008, which ruled her out of the following season.

Personal life 

Her work in the sport for development field has been ongoing since the age of 16.  She is an athlete ambassador for Right To Play and Show Racism the Red Card. She also serves in the Sport Envoy Program run by the US State Department in conjunction with the US Soccer Federation, going on envoys abroad to promote healthy lifestyles, and sport for diplomacy.

Since 2008, Fair has worked with several projects, such as Charlize Theron's Africa Outreach Project and her own Kickabout Africa 2010 project, to promote development efforts in Africa.

References 

1978 births
Living people
United States women's international soccer players
North Carolina Tar Heels women's soccer players
Parade High School All-Americans (girls' soccer)
Footballers at the 2000 Summer Olympics
Expatriate women's footballers in England
Olympic silver medalists for the United States in soccer
Expatriate women's footballers in France
Olympique Lyonnais Féminin players
Women's United Soccer Association players
Chelsea F.C. Women players
FIFA Century Club
American sportspeople of Chinese descent
American sportswomen of Chinese descent
American expatriate sportspeople in France
American expatriate sportspeople in England
FIFA Women's World Cup-winning players
Major League Soccer broadcasters
Medalists at the 2000 Summer Olympics
American women's soccer players
Philadelphia Charge players
Women's association football midfielders
Women association football commentators
American twins
Twin sportspeople
Division 1 Féminine players
1999 FIFA Women's World Cup players
People from Los Altos, California